Diagolon is a Canadian alt-right organization which was considered significant to the Canada convoy protest by the Government of Canada. It is led by Jeremy MacKenzie.

Organisation and aims 
Diagolon is a right wing, alt-right, extremist militia network with chapters throughout Canada. It has been described in a report by the House of Commons of Canada as a "violent extremist organisation." According to the Canadian Anti-Hate Network the "neo-fascist militia" The Group believes that "a violent revolution is coming," and is an "accelerationist movement that believes a revolution is inevitable and necessary to collapse the current government system. It wants to build its ideal nation-state, which runs diagonally from Alaska through the western provinces down to Florida".  A member of Diagolon, Alex Vriend, was noted by the Canadian Anti-Hate Network  as "one of the most outspoken and influential members" and was reported to be an antisemite and a Holocaust  denier. Barbara Perry, director of Ontario Tech University's Centre on Hate, Bias and Extremism, described Diagolon's ambition to create a "white ethnonationalist state" which would "run diagonally from the Pacific Northwest through Canada to Florida". as irony poisoning to normalise hateful rhetoric through humour. The group's motto is “gun or rope".

History 
The group emerged from the Plaid Army, according to the Canadian Anti-Hate Network who also report that the group was started by Jeremy MacKenzie in 2020.

The group's flag was present at the Canada convoy protest in Ottawa. Following the seizure of weapons, ammunition, and body armour from the property of a murder conspiracy plot suspect during the protest blockade of the Sweetgrass–Coutts Border Crossing, one piece of body armour was identified to have Diagolon patches. In February 2023, Paul Rouleau described Diagolon's presence at both the Ottawa and Coutts protests as "the most troubling connection between protest locations" in his report following the Public Order Emergency Commission into the use of the Emergencies Act.

Canadian politician Pierre Poilievre called Diagolon "losers" and "dirtbags" after group founder Jeremy MacKenzie spoke about sexually assaulting Poilievre's wife, Anaida.

References

External links 

 Official website (archive)

Canadian far-right political movements
Canada convoy protest
Alt-right organizations
Far-right politics in Canada
2020 establishments in Canada